Colegio NS de Pompei (originally called "Scuola Nostra Signora di Pompei") is an Italian private & religious school in Caracas (Venezuela).

History

The Colegio Italo venezolano "Nuestra Señora de Pompei" was created in the early 1960s by the catholic fathers Scalabriniani to meet the educational and catholic needs of the Italian community in eastern Caracas.  The initial courses of the Scuola Elementare Pompei (as was called, because it had only primary courses for 47 Italian kids) were in Italian language with some Spanish lessons, but after a few years all the courses were bilingual in Spanish and Italian.

The school was enlarged when was built the Pompei Church in the Alta Florida neighbourhood.

In the late 1970s it was added the "Bachillerato" (Mid-High school), that was done mainly in Spanish but with some Italian lessons. Actually the "Colegio Pompei" (as is usually called) has nearly 1000 students and all the courses are only in Spanish language.

Since 2001 Italian is done as a foreign language mandatory in kinder to mid-high school ("Bachillerato venezolano") in the so-called Programa de estudio de la lengua Italiana of the Venezuela government. Lately are celebrated some "Festivals" in the High School

Notes

Bibliography
 Cassani Pironti, Fabio. Gli italiani in Venezuela dall’Indipendenza al Secondo Dopoguerra. Roma, 2004
 Scalabriniani official site:

See also
 Colegio Agustín Codazzi
 Colegio Amerigo Vespucci
 Colegio De Marta
 Colegio Antonio Rosmini
 Italo-Venezuelans
 Italian language in Venezuela
 Scalabriniani

Italian international schools in South America
International schools in Venezuela